"Isn't It Always Love" is a song written by Karla Bonoff. It was originally recorded by Bonoff as well for her debut studio album. The song went unreleased as a single until American country music artist Lynn Anderson recorded the track in 1979. The song became a top ten hit for the same year.

Versions

Karla Bonoff version
American singer-songwriter Karla Bonoff had recorded the original version of "Isn't It Always Love". The track was recorded at the Sound Factory, located in Los Angeles, California. The song was not issued as a single, but appeared on her debut 1977 album, which was also titled Karla Bonoff. The album was issued as a vinyl record, with "Isn't It Always Love" appearing as the first track on "side one". When reviewing the album, Ruhlmann commented on the song's musical style, saying they "paint an effective picture of the ups and downs of love, circa the mid-'70s."

Lynn Anderson version

Anderson recorded her version in 1979 at the Sounds Lab Studio, located in Nashville, Tennessee. The sessions was produced by David Wolfert. Anderson had recently begun working with Wolfert after many years under the production supervision of Glenn Sutton

"Isn't It Always Love" reached number 10 on the Billboard Hot Country Singles chart in 1979. It also reached the top ten on the Canadian RPM Country Songs chart the same year. "Isn't It Always Love" became Anderson's first single to reach the top ten since 1974. The song was issued on Anderson's 1979 studio album, Outlaw Is Just a State of Mind.

Track listings
7" vinyl single
 "Isn't It Always Love" – 2:58
 "A Child with You Tonight" – 2:45

Chart performance

References

1979 singles
1979 songs
Columbia Records singles
Karla Bonoff songs
Lynn Anderson songs
Songs written by Karla Bonoff